Dubai Seenu  is a 2007 Indian Telugu-language action comedy film directed by Srinu Vaitla. Produced by D. V. V. Danayya, the film stars Ravi Teja and Nayanthara. It has music composed by Mani Sharma.

It was remade in Kannada as Dubai Babu. A Tamil dubbed version titled Dubai Rani was released in Chennai on 29 July 2016.

Plot
Srinivas (Ravi Teja) is popular in his village as Dubai Seenu. He dreams of seeking his fortune in Dubai. Seenu and his friends reach Mumbai but unfortunately, get cheated by a fraudster Tataji (Venu Madhav) because of Ramki alias Rama Krishna (Brahmanandam). After realizing that they were cheated, the friends start a Pav Bhaji center with the help of Patnaik (Krishna Bhagavaan), who is also a fraudster.

Madhumati (Nayanthara), who was working as an RJ, goes to Mumbai in search of her brother. Seenu meets Madhu on a local train and loses his heart. Luckily, she surfaces right before his Pav Bhaji center. Seenu dares to propose his love, but Madhu does not reply and disappears. While Seenu was in search of Madhu, he meets Chakri (J. D. Chakravarthy). Seenu helps Chakri, who loved Puja (Neha Bamb), and got them married. Chakri and Puja promise Seenu to help him to go to Dubai. They make all arrangements. They, too, plan to return to Hyderabad to repay the loan borrowed by Chakri's father for his education. Just before leaving the office, Chakri and Puja find that their boss is none other than Jinnah Bhai (Sushant Singh) the most wanted mafia don in India.

Finding that the couple recognized him, Jinnah and his brother kill Chakri and Puja right before Seenu. Minutes before his death, Chakri reveals that Madhu was his sister. Seenu returns to Hyderabad, where he meets Madhu and pays off her debt. When she asks how he got the money, he reveals that it is her brother's money. Madhu's uncle Babji (Sayaji Shinde) also wants to marry her. In the end, Seenu kills Jinnah and his henchmen and marries Madhu.

Cast

Production
The film marks Vaitla's third collaboration with Teja after Nee Kosam and Venky.

Music 
Music was composed by Manisharma. Lyrics were written by Ramajogayya Sastry and Sahithi.

Critical reception 

The film was well received by both audience and critics. The Hindu wrote "Yes, there are blemishes in the screenplay but in a movie like this, one is really not supposed to bother about them as logic (Dubai Seenu never visits Dubai) is never the motive!" Idlebrain wrote "On a while it’s a time pass film if you are looking for Ravi Teja kind of comedy".

Box-office performance
The movie has earned 10.73 crore rupees in its opening week and 15.89 crore rupees by the end of the second week, giving a strong competition with Sivaji (2007), a Rajinikanth starrer. Considering its budget of 9 crore, it was declared a super hit. It brought Ravi Teja, depressed after the failure of Khatarnak, a great joy and was released with nearly 250 prints.

References

External links
 

2007 films
2000s Telugu-language films
2007 action comedy films
Indian action comedy films
Telugu films remade in other languages
Films directed by Srinu Vaitla
Films scored by Mani Sharma
2007 comedy films